Gangarampur Girls' High School is an Upper Primary with Secondary and Higher Secondary School for Girls only situated at Ward No.-7 of Gangarampur Municipality in Dakshin Dinajpur district of West Bengal. It was founded by professor Dhiren kumar Ghosh. It was established in the year 1958 and the school management ims Department of Education. It's a Bengali Medium - Co-educational school.

See also
Gangarampur College
Gangarampur Government Polytechnic

References

Schools in Dakshin Dinajpur district
High schools and secondary schools in West Bengal
Gangarampur
Girls' schools in West Bengal
Educational institutions established in 1958
1958 establishments in West Bengal